The 2012 NCAA National Collegiate Women's Ice Hockey Tournament involved eight schools in single-elimination play that determined the national champion of women's NCAA Division I college ice hockey. The Frozen Four were hosted by the Minnesota-Duluth Bulldogs at AMSOIL Arena in Duluth, Minnesota.

Bracket
Quarterfinals held at home sites of seeded teams

Note: * denotes overtime period(s)

Tournament awards

All-Tournament Team
G: Noora Räty*, Minnesota, 
D: Megan Bozek, Minnesota, 
F: Sarah Erickson, Minnesota
F: Amanda Kessel, Minnesota
F: Carolyne Prévost, Wisconsin
F: Brooke Ammerman, Wisconsin
* Most Outstanding Player

See also
2012 NCAA Division I Men's Ice Hockey Tournament
2012 NCAA Division III Women's Ice Hockey Tournament
2012 CIS Women's Ice Hockey Tournament

References

NCAA Women's Ice Hockey Tournament

2012 in sports in Minnesota